Thomas Walker Huey House is a historic home located near Lancaster, Lancaster County, South Carolina. It was built in 1847–1848, and is a simple, two-story, clapboard-sided, Greek Revival style dwelling . It has a full-façade one-story shed roof porch. Thomas Walker Huey (1798–1854) was a prominent 19th century merchant, planter, and politician.

It was added to the National Register of Historic Places in 1990.

See also 
 Leroy Springs House

References 

Houses on the National Register of Historic Places in South Carolina
Greek Revival houses in South Carolina
Houses completed in 1848
Houses in Lancaster County, South Carolina
National Register of Historic Places in Lancaster County, South Carolina